The Welch Baronetcy, of Chard in the County of Somerset, is a title in the Baronetage of the United Kingdom. It was created on 16 December 1957 for Cullum Welch, Lord Mayor of London from 1956 to 1957. As of 2010 the title is held by his son, the second Baronet, who succeeded in 1980.

Welch baronets, of Chard (1957)
Sir (George James) Cullum Welch, 1st Baronet (1895–1980)
Sir John Reader Welch, 2nd Baronet (born 1933)

Notes

References
Kidd, Charles, Williamson, David (editors). Debrett's Peerage and Baronetage (1990 edition). New York: St Martin's Press, 1990, 

Welch